Sar Daj Delmorad (also Romanized as Sar Daj Delmorād; also known as Dej, Sar Daj, and Sar Dej) is a village in Pir Sohrab Rural District, in the Central District of Chabahar County, Sistan and Baluchestan Province, Iran. At the 2006 census, its population was 78, in 14 families.

References 

Populated places in Chabahar County